Scopula erebospila is a moth of the  family Geometridae. It is found in Australia (Queensland).

References

Moths described in 1902
erebospila
Moths of Australia